Above the Earth, Below the Sky is the first full-length studio album by American post-rock band If These Trees Could Talk. It was independently released on March 11, 2009 and then re-released by The Mylene Sheath on vinyl the following year then released once again through Metal Blade in January 2015. The album was recorded, mixed and mastered by Tim Gerak at Mammoth Cave Studio in Akron. The album was produced by Zack Kelly and Tim Gerak.

Reception

Nathaniel Lay of New Noise Magazine gave the album a positive review, describing the album as an "ambitious beginning" noting a "[slight falter]" in their "heavier movements". He summarized by stating "You don't have to be a lover of instrumental to get lost within [this band]."

Track listing
All songs written by If These Trees Could Talk.

Personnel
If These Trees Could Talk
 Tom Fihe – bass
 Zack Kelly – drums
 Cody Kelly – guitar
 Jeff Kalal – guitar
 Mike Socrates – guitar
Production
 Tim Gerak – engineering, mixing, mastering, producer
 Zack Kelly – producer

References

2009 debut albums
If These Trees Could Talk albums
Self-released albums
Metal Blade Records albums
Albums produced by Tim Gerak